Cladochytriales is an order of chytrid fungi. It is the only order in the monotypic class Cladochytriomycetes. The order was described in 2009 to accommodate a monophyletic clade containing many genera of chytrid fungi often observed growing over decaying plant tissue and other cellulosic substrates from aquatic habitats and humid soils.

Taxonomy
The 2022 taxonomy of fungi places 5 families and 3 uncertain genera in Cladochytriales:
Family Catenochytridiaceae 
Catenochytridium 

Family Cladochytriaceae 
Cladochytrium 

Family Endochytriaceae 
Diplophlyctis 
Endochytrium 

Family Nowakowskiellaceae 
Nowakowskiella 

Family Septochytriaceae 
Septochytrium 

incertae sedis
Allochytrium  (=Allochytridium )
Cylindrochytridium 
Nephrochytrium

References

Chytridiomycota
Fungus orders